Several vessels have been named Camilla:

Camilla (1792 ship)
 , of 309, or 309 tons (bm), was launched at Whitby 15 June 1792 by John Barry. However, Camilla does not appear in the most complete listing of vessels built in Whitby. She first appeared in Lloyd's Register in 1794, with Jn. Bone, master and owner. On 30 May 1797 Camilla was sold at Lloyd's Coffee House for a West Indiaman. She was no longer listed in Lloyd's Register in 1797. Although Camilla appears in a listing of ships sailing to India under a license from the British East India Company, there is no supporting evidence from Lloyd's Lists ship arrival and departure data.

Camilla (1794 ship)
Camilla, of 163 tons (bm), was launched in 1794 at Amesbury, Massachusetts. On 3 September 1798, Ebenezer Parsons registered her at Boston, and commissioned her as a private armed ship. During the United States's Quasi War with France, on 5 February 1799, Camilla, Thomas Seward, master, defeated a two French privateers off Lisbon Rocks. Camilla recaptured the brig's prize, a Portuguese brig, which she restored to the master. Then on 26 July, Camilla recaptured off the Elbe the American brig Little John from her French prize crew. By one report Camilla was tried at Paris.

Camilla (1800 ship)
 was built in France in 1799 and was captured by the British. The French recaptured her in 1801.

See also
 – either of two vessels of the British Royal Navy

Citations

References
 
 
 
 

Ship names